The Harp Bar was a public house and live music venue based in Hill Street, central Belfast, Northern Ireland. It's notable in the context of punk rock history, particularly music from Northern Ireland.It was owned between 1977 and 1984 by Patrick (Patsy) Lennon who some years later built and owned the Limelight nightclub and Dome Bar (two adjacent premises in Ormeau Avenue, Belfast).

History 

The Harp Bar was functioning as a city centre bar and music venue at the height of the conflict and troubles in Northern Ireland. Despite tensions in the city and occasional bomb attacks on the premises by paramilitaries the bar continued to trade and young people from all across the city and further afield regularly attended gigs.

The Harp opened its doors to punk bands in early 1978. Victim, supported by The Androids, on 21 April 1978 was the first punk gig at the venue. Soon, it became the home for punk in Belfast. Rudi made their Harp debut in May 1978. Stiff Little Fingers played at the venue three times, in May, July and August 1978.

The Harp was a small venue badly in need of repair and modernisation but it became the centre of the Belfast Punk scene.  “It became blindingly obvious that if punk was to survive, it needed a venue of its own. Enter The Harp Bar. It was located on Hill Street – a stone’s throw from St Anne’s Cathedral on the north edge of Belfast city centre – and seen from the outside with its metal security grills and blacked-out windows, you could be forgiven for thinking it was a condemned building. It had not escaped the Troubles unscathed … It might have been an absolute dump but The Harp kept punk alive, and indeed punk kept it alive.” (Terri Hooley, Good Vibrations)

The bar was situated in what was a rundown corner of a Belfast city centre that was deserted at night due to the troubles.  It became a relatively safe venue for both Protestant and Catholic punks to mix and listen to the large number of local bands that were forming, inspired by Punk.  “At a time when the religious divide in Northern Ireland was most pronounced, we had kids from both sides of the community coming together in the name of music.” (Terri Hooley, Good Vibrations) “It really was the first time I can remember that significant numbers of young people from all sections and classes of community, and from both sides of the sectarian divide were able to meet up and get to know each other, initially drawn together by their enthusiasm for this new music and lifestyle.” (Brian Young, Rudi)

The Harp was no hippy ‘peace and love’ music venue, it was rough and tough but any arguments and fights were usually over who were the authentic punks or who sold out.  “The punks upstairs could also have rough-house tendencies. The daily aggression of Belfast life was reflected in the upstairs bar, even if it wasn’t about religious sectarianism” (Stuart Bailie, Trouble Songs).

Many local punk rock bands including The Outcasts, Rudi, Stiff Little Fingers, The Defects and others appeared at the venue. It was quickly recognised as the premier punk rock venue in Ireland and started attracting touring bands such as The Nipple Erectors and The Monochrome Set. According to one regular, "It stank. It smelled of armpit and stale beer. The toilets were DREADFUL." They loved it.

The Harp, as a punk venue, appeared in a number of documentaries and TV news clips, including the independent documentary film Shellshock Rock. The youth BBC TV show Something Else broadcast in January 1980 carried a report on the punk scene in Belfast, which featured footage and interviews from the Harp Bar. The Something Else clip of punks on the Harp Bar dance floor regularly appears in reruns of the BBC’s Top Of The Pops The Story of 1977 as representative of what the punk movement was all about.

“By the end of ‘79, things had gone a bit stale. Bands started to get a bit fed up playing at the same venue and to the same old faces, and gigs began to get cancelled at the last minute. Frustration started to creep in”. The Harp stopped hosting punk gigs in mid-1981 when it became a Country & Western themed bar.

The original venue closed in the 1990s and a new Harp Bar opened elsewhere in Belfast in 2013 as a tribute to the original venue.

In 2019 there were plans to build a hotel on the Hill Street site.

References

Music venues in Belfast
Former pubs in the United Kingdom
Former music venues in the United Kingdom